Justin Dorey (born August 17, 1988) is a Canadian freestyle skier. He won the silver medal in the halfpipe at the 2009 FIS Freestyle World Ski Championships. Dorey represented Canada at the 2014 Winter Olympics in the halfpipe event.

References

1988 births
Canadian male freestyle skiers
Freestyle skiers at the 2014 Winter Olympics
Living people
Olympic freestyle skiers of Canada
Skiers from Calgary
Superpipe skiers